Katowice Power Station is a coal-fired power station in Katowice, Poland. It consists of four units. In 2000 a new unit of BCF-100 type with a heat capacity of 200 MW and electric generation capacity of 135.5 MW was added.

See also

 Bełchatów Power Station
 Jaworzno Power Station 
 Kozienice Power Station 
 Połaniec Power Station 
 Łaziska Power Station

References

Energy infrastructure completed in 1985
Energy infrastructure completed in 1991
Buildings and structures in Katowice
Coal-fired power stations in Poland
Cogeneration power stations in Poland
1985 establishments in Poland